The Baykonurian glaciation is a glacial episode dating to around the Proterozoic–Phanerozoic boundary, at the end of the Ediacaran Period. The date of  has been proposed in the literature. The glaciation is posited as a contributor to the Cambrian explosion. Its deposits are known in regions of Asia and Africa, and it apparently affected both palaeohemispheres. Glacial deposits possibly related to this glaciation have been found to be dated between 549 and 530 Ma. It is named for the Baykonur Formation in Central Asia.

References

Ice ages
Ediacaran events